The 2021–22 Taipei Fubon Braves season was the franchise's second season in the P. LEAGUE+ (PLG), its 8th in Taipei City. The Braves are coached by Hsu Chin-Che in his fifth year as head coach.

Draft 

On October 27, 2021, the first rounder, Wang Lu-Hsiang was traded to Kaohsiung Steelers in exchange for 2022 first-round draft pick.

Standings

Roster

Game log

Preseason

Regular season

Playoffs

Finals

Player Statistics 
<noinclude>

Regular season

Playoffs

Finals

 Reference：

Transactions

Trades

Free Agency

Re-signed

Additions

Subtractions

Awards

Finals Awards

End-of-Season Awards

Players of the Week

References 

Taipei Fubon Braves seasons
Taipei Fubon Braves